The 1880 Missouri gubernatorial election was held on November 2, 1880 and resulted in a victory for the Democratic nominee, former Congressman Thomas Theodore Crittenden, over the Republican candidate, former Congressman David Patterson Dyer, and Greenback nominee Luman A. Brown.

Missouri returned to electing its governor to a 4-year term, instead of a 2-year term.

Results

References

Missouri
1880
Gubernatorial
November 1880 events